The Sign Painter (– 'city by the river') is a 2020 Latvian historical drama directed by Viestur Kairish. The film premiered on 15 January 2020 in Latvia and on 19 November 2020 internationally at the Tallinn Black Nights Film Festival.

Plot 

The Sign Painter is a tragicomedy about a young Latvian man, Ansis, with simple dreams: to marry Zisele, the free-spirited and beautiful daughter of a local Jewish merchant, and to pursue a career as an artist whilst supporting himself as a sign painter. But his dreams are repeatedly swept away in the tumultuous tides of serial totalitarian occupation of his home during World War II.

References

External links
 
 Official trailer 

2020 films
Latvian documentary films
Latvian-language films
Eastern Front of World War II films
Baltic states World War II films